Picardia ruwenzoricus is a moth of the family Pterophoridae. It is known from the Democratic Republic of Congo.

References

Oidaematophorini
Insects of the Democratic Republic of the Congo
Moths of Africa
Moths described in 1991
Taxa named by Cees Gielis
Endemic fauna of the Democratic Republic of the Congo